Coluzea mariae is a species of pagoda shell, a deepwater sea snail, a marine gastropod mollusc in the family Columbariidae, the pagoda shells.

Distribution 
This species occurs in New Zealand.

References

 Powell, A. W. B. (1952). New Zealand molluscan systematics, with descriptions of new species. Part 1. Records of the Auckland Institute and Museum. 4: 169-185.
 Harasewych M.G. (2011) The living Columbariinae (Gastropoda: Neogastropoda: Turbinellidae) of New Zealand. Zootaxa 2744: 1–33
 Maxwell, P.A. (2009). Cenozoic Mollusca. Pp 232-254 in Gordon, D.P. (ed.) New Zealand inventory of biodiversity. Volume one. Kingdom Animalia: Radiata, Lophotrochozoa, Deuterostomia. Canterbury University Press, Christchurch.
 Spencer, H.G., Marshall, B.A. & Willan, R.C. (2009). Checklist of New Zealand living Mollusca. Pp 196-219. in: Gordon, D.P. (ed.) New Zealand inventory of biodiversity. Volume one. Kingdom Animalia: Radiata, Lophotrochozoa, Deuterostomia. Canterbury University Press, Christchurch.

Columbariidae
Gastropods of New Zealand
Gastropods described in 1952